"Echo" is the third official single from American R&B singer R. Kelly's 2009 album, Untitled.

Chart History

R. Kelly songs
Songs written by Claude Kelly
Songs written by R. Kelly
2009 songs
Jive Records singles
Songs written by Infinity (producer)
Songs written by Darhyl Camper